Mattawan may refer to:

 Mattawan, Michigan, United States
Mattawan High School, in Mattawan, Michigan
 Mattawan, Ontario, Canada

See also

 Matawan (disambiguation)
 Mattawa (disambiguation)